Jarmon is a surname. Notable people with the surname include:

Jeremy Jarmon (born 1987), American football player
Nehorai Jarmon (–1760), Tunisian rabbi and poet
Tara Jarmon, Canadian fashion designer
Maelyn Jarmon (born 1992), American singer

See also
Jarmond, surname
Harmon (name)